Boulevard du Rhum also known as Rum Runners is a 1971 French-Italian-Spanish adventure film directed by Robert Enrico and produced by Alain Poiré. It is based on Jacques Pecheral's novel of the same name. It stars Brigitte Bardot and Lino Ventura and was released in France on 13 October 1971.

Plot
Set in the prohibition era, a rum runner (Ventura) in the Caribbean falls in love with a beautiful silent film star, Linda Larue (Bardot).

Cast
Brigitte Bardot as Linda Larue
Lino Ventura as Cornelius von Zeelinga
Bill Travers as Sanderson
Clive Revill as Lord Hammond
La Polaca as Catharina
Jess Hahn as Piet aka "Big Dutch"
Antonio Casas as Wilkinson
Andreas Voutsinas as Alvarez
Guy Marchand as Ronald / The Actor
Jack Betts as Renner
Florence Giorgetti as Linda's guest

Production
The film began shooting in Mexico and the British Honduras in September 1970. The film was also partially shot in Parisian studios and in Andalucia, Spain.

Reception
The New York Times regarded the film as a professional breakthrough for Bardot, deeming it as a signifier of "the death of a star—the last star, perhaps—and the birth of an actress: Brigitte Bardot."

Soundtrack
The score and soundtrack were composed by François de Roubaix, with Bardot lending her vocals to certain songs.

1. Chant des rumrunners / Générique
2. Sur le boulevard du rhum (by Brigitte Bardot)
3. Le jeu de l'aveugle
4. La posada / Gramophone rumba
5. Chanson de Ronald (by Guy Marchand)
6. Ragtime du ver solitaire
7. Bataille navale
8. Tango del patio
9. Linda et Cornelius (Version 1)
10. MacAlister's wedding song I (by Joe Turner)
11. Ben-moor hôtel
12. Au cinéma muet
13. Plaisir d'amour (by Brigitte Bardot and Guy Marchand)
14. Prohibition rag
15. Linda et Cornelius (Version 2)

References

External links
 

1971 films
French adventure films
1970s French-language films
Films based on French novels
Films directed by Robert Enrico
1970s adventure films
Films set in the 1920s
Films set in the Caribbean
Seafaring films
Films about prohibition in the United States
Films shot in Almería
Films scored by François de Roubaix
1970s French films